Let's Connect Slovenia (PoS) is a political alliance in Slovenia. It ran in the 2022 parliamentary election but did not win any seats.

Composition

Results

National Assembly

References

Agrarian parties in Slovenia
Conservative parties in Slovenia
Centre-right parties in Europe
Centrist parties in Slovenia
Green parties in Europe
Political party alliances in Slovenia
Political parties established in 2021